Ibrahim Touré may refer to:

 Ibrahim Touré (footballer, born 1985) (1985–2014), Ivorian footballer
 Ibrahim Touré (footballer, born 1995), Dutch footballer
 Ibrahim Sory Touré (1970-1996), Malian footballer

See also
Ibrahima Touré (born 1985), Senegalese footballer